Roland Chia Ming Shen is a Malaysian politician from BERSATU. He was the Member of Sabah State Legislative Assembly for Inanam from 2013 to 2018.

Politics 
Roland was appointed as the Chief of BERSEKUTU Wing of BERSATU Sabah on 14 October 2021. He is also the Political secretary for Chief Minister of Sabah, Hajiji Noor.

Election result

Honours 
  :
  Commander of the Order of Kinabalu (PGDK) - Datuk (2021)

References 

21st-century Malaysian politicians
People from Sabah
Malaysian United Indigenous Party politicians
Former People's Justice Party (Malaysia) politicians
Members of the Sabah State Legislative Assembly
Malaysian people of Chinese descent
Malaysian politicians of Chinese descent
Living people
Year of birth missing (living people)
Commanders of the Order of Kinabalu